The 1995 Brown Bears football team was an American football team that represented Brown University during the 1995 NCAA Division I-AA football season. Brown tied for second-to-last in the Ivy League. 

In their second season under head coach Mark Whipple, the Bears compiled a 5–5 record and outscored opponents 282 to 239. Paul Fichiera was the team captain. 

The Bears' 2–5 conference record tied for sixth place in the Ivy League standings. Despite a losing league record, they outscored Ivy opponents 193 to 191. 

Brown played its home games at Brown Stadium in Providence, Rhode Island.

Schedule

References

Brown
Brown Bears football seasons
Brown Bears football